Marnham is an English surname.

People 
Notable people with the name include:

Christian Marnham, British film director
Francis John Marnham (1853-1941), British politician and businessman
Patrick Marnham, English writer, journalist and biographer

Places 

 Marnham, an administrative civil parish in Nottinghamshire, England, which comprises:
 High Marnham
 Low Marnham

English-language surnames